"Lloro y Lloro" is a song by American duo Xtreme. It served as the second single for their third album, Chapter Dos (2008).

Charts

References

2008 songs
2008 singles
Xtreme (group) songs